Giuseppe Ferrandino (born 24 January 1958) is an Italian comic book author and novelist.

Ferrandino studied medicine at the University of Naples without completing his degree, but following instead his passion of working as a comic strip scriptwriter.
At the end of the seventies, he produced a series of renowned scripts, for publications such as Nero, Lanciostory, Dylan Dog, and Mickey Mouse, reaching the peak of his scriptwriting popularity in the 1980s.

In 1993, his novel Pericle il nero (Pericles the Black Man) was published by Granata Press, hardly noticed by the Italian readership. However, after being translated into French by Gallimard, the novel was republished in 1998 in Italy by Adelphi Edizioni, with great success. The story is constructed as an American noir, with a realistic Neapolitan dialect and strong characters, often verging on the grotesque as represented by the pulp literary genre.

In 1999, his second novel, Il rispetto, ovvero Pino Pentecoste contro i guappi (Respect, or Pino Pentecoste against the Blabbermouths), was published by Adelphi, followed by the fairy tale Lidia e i turchi (Lydia and the Turks) published by Mondadori. Other successful novels have been published by Ferrandino, among which Spada (Sword) (2007), a reprise of Dumas' Three Musketeers.

In 2007 American director Abel Ferrara produced the film version of Ferrandino's 1st novel, with Italian actor Riccardo Scamarcio in the starring role.

Ferrandino lives in Rome, although he often spends lengthy periods in Chicago.

Bibliography
 Pericle il Nero, Granata Press, 1993 
 Périclès le Noir, Gallimard, 1995 
 Pericle il Nero, Adelphi, 1998 
 Pericle der Schwarze, Suhrkamp, 2000 
 Pericles de Zwarte, Amsterdam, 2001 
 Pericle den svarte, Oslo, 2002 
 Il rispetto (ovvero Pino Pentecoste contro i guappi), Adelphi, 1999 
 Respekt oder Pino Pentecoste gegen die Maulhelden, Suhrkamp, 2001 
 Le respect : Pino Pentecoste contre les camorristes, Gallimard, 2004 
 Lidia e i Turchi, Mondadori, 1999 
 Saverio del Nord Ovest, Bompiani, 2001 
 Cento modi per salvarsi la vita con un pacchetto di sigarette senza fumarlo, Bompiani, 2001 
 Spada, Mondadori, 2007 
 Rosmunda l'inglese, Mondadori, 2008

Notes

External links 
 Giuseppe Ferrandino biography on RAI International
 Giuseppe Ferrandino o la rapidità, article by F. De Michele, 2004 

Italian comics writers
Italian male writers
Pulp fiction
Writers from Naples
1958 births
Living people
University of Naples Federico II alumni